Boenasa is a genus of moths in the subfamily Arctiinae. The genus was erected by Francis Walker in 1865.

Selected species
 Boenasa nigrorosea Walker, [1865]
 Boenasa polyphron (Druce, 1894)
 Boenasa tricolor (Herrich-Schaffer, 1866)

References

External links

Lithosiini
Moth genera